Tselinny (Siźäm) is a rural locality (a selo) and the administrative center of Almukhametovsky Selsoviet, Abzelilovsky District, Bashkortostan, Russia. The population was 1,404 as of 2010. There are 16 streets.

Geography 
Tselinny is located 51 km south of Askarovo (the district's administrative centre) by road. Almukhametovo is the nearest rural locality.

References 

Rural localities in Abzelilovsky District